John Purroy Mitchel was a fireboat operated by the FDNY. She was named after former mayor of New York City, John Purroy Mitchel. Grace Drennan, niece of Fire Commissioner Thomas J. Drennan played a ceremonial role in the vessels launch on July 24, 1921. Her launch was also attended by current mayor John Francis Hylan.

John Purroy Mitchel was the city's first fireboat powered by fuel-oil, not coal. One of her water cannons was mounted on top of a  tower.

John Purroy Mitchel was built by Standard Shipbuilding Corporation, of Shooter's Island, and was budgeted at $220,000, but came in under budget, at $200,000.

On October 5, 1926 the crew of the ocean liner  discovered a fire in one of her cargo holds. John Purroy Mitchel assisted , which was the first fireboat on scene. The two fireboats pumped water into the burning hold, and Byron reached the quarantine station under her own power.

The vessel was still in operation in 1962, when the John Glenn joined the fleet.

References 

Fireboats of New York City
1921 ships